Adriaan Fondse (born 9 June 1983) is a South African rugby union footballer  formerly playing for Newcastle Falcons.

Education
Fondse attended Afrikaanse Hoër Seunskool (Afrikaans High School for Boys, also known as Affies), a public school located in Pretoria. He attended alongside Bulls players Wynand Olivier, Pierre Spies, Fourie du Preez, Derick Kuun and Jacques-Louis Potgieter, Stade Français lock Cliff Milton and Titans Cricketers AB de Villiers, Heino Kuhn, Faf du Plessis and Jacques Rudolph.

References

External links 
Stormers profile
WP rugby profile

1983 births
Living people
South African rugby union players
Rugby union locks
Rugby union players from Pretoria
Western Province (rugby union) players
Stormers players
Blue Bulls players